Enda Condron is a former Gaelic footballer who played as a forward at senior level for the Laois county team during the 1960s and 1970s.

In 1967, he was part of the Laois team that won the Leinster Minor Football Championship.

He assisted his home club Ballylinan to victory in the Laois Intermediate Football Championship in 1973.

References

Year of birth missing (living people)
Living people
Ballylinan Gaelic footballers
Laois inter-county Gaelic footballers
UCD Gaelic footballers